Fornacite is a rare lead, copper chromate arsenate hydroxide mineral with the formula: Pb2Cu(CrO4)(AsO4)(OH). It forms a series with the phosphate mineral vauquelinite.  It forms variably green to yellow, translucent to transparent crystals in the monoclinic - prismatic crystal system. It has a Mohs hardness of 2.3 and a specific gravity of 6.27.

It was first described in 1915 and named after Lucien Lewis Forneau (1867–1930) the governor of the French Congo. Its type locality is in Reneville, Republic of Congo.

It occurs in the oxidized zone of ore deposits and is associated with dioptase, wulfenite, hemihedrite, phoenicochroite, duftite, mimetite, shattuckite, chrysocolla, hemimorphite, willemite and fluorite.

References

Lead minerals
Copper(II) minerals
Chromate minerals
Arsenate minerals
Monoclinic minerals
Minerals in space group 14